Yarmouk University, also abbreviated YU, is a comprehensive public and state supported university located near the city centre of Irbid in northern Jordan. Since its establishment in 1976, Yarmouk University (YU) has been at the forefront of Jordanian and Middle Eastern universities. The University consists of 15 faculties offering 52 bachelor's degrees, 64 master's degrees, and 18 PhD Programs in different disciplines. The university also hosts 12 research and career centers.

As the Academic Year 2016/2017, the university has 1,004 faculty members and 1,597 staff with 34,651 students in all academic programs (31,282 Undergraduate, 2,807 Postgraduate and 562 Doctoral). In addition, there are currently around 5,000 international students from 50 different nations.

History 
YU was established in 1976, and currently contains 15 faculties.

Each year YU grants over 4000 Bachelor and Master Degrees. The university started with few number of faculty members; now it hosts 1,004 faculty, of which 260 are full professors, 239 associate professors, 278 assistant professors, and 227 lecturers. The controlled enrollment of the student body is grounded on the university's vision to maintain the standards of higher education in Jordan, in parallel with national educational policies.

University presidents 
 Prof. Islam Masad
 Prof. Nabeel Heilat
 Prof. Zeidan Kafafi
Prof. Adnan Badran
 Prof. Mohammad Hamdan
 Prof. Ali Mahafza
 Prof. Marwan Kamal
 Prof. Fayez Khasawneh
 Prof. Mohammad Sabarini
 Prof. Mohammad Abu-Qudais
 Prof. Sultan Abu-Orabi
 Prof. Abdallah Al-Mousa
 Prof. Refat Al-Faouri

Campus 
YU campus is located near the city center of Irbid, the second largest city in Jordan. The campus consists of independent buildings for each faculty and administration unit.

Academics 
There are fifteen faculties in the Yarmouk University that offer doctoral, graduate and undergraduate degrees, the medium of lectures, exams, and tuition depends in the faculty, scientific faculties use mainly English while other faculties use mainly Arabic, while Arabic is the main communication language in the university.

Scientific colleges 

Faculty of Science:
Mathematics
Physics
Chemistry
Biological Sciences
Statistics
Earth and Environment
Hijjawi Faculty of Engineering Technology:
Biomedical Systems and Informatics Engineering
Civil Engineering
Computer Engineering
Electronic Engineering
Power Engineering
Telecommunications Engineering
Architectural Engineering
Industrial Engineering
Faculty of IT and Computer science:
Computer Sciences 
Computer Information Systems
Management Information Systems
Software Engineering  
Network Security and Systems  
Faculty of Medicine 

Faculty of Pharmacy and Pharmaceutical sciences

Colleges of arts and humanity sciences 
 Faculty of Arts:
Arabic Language and Literature 
English Language and Literature 
Modern Languages
Semitic and Eastern Languages 
Translation
History
Sociology and Social Work
Political Sciences
Geography
 Faculty of Education:
Curriculum and Instruction 
Administration and Foundations 
Counseling and Ed. Psychology
Elementary Education 
Faculty of Fine arts:
Fine Arts
Drama
Design
Music
 Faculty of Economics and Administrative Sciences:
Economics
Accounting
Marketing
Finance and Banking
Public Administration
Business Administration
 Faculty of Shari'a and Islamic Studies:
Fiqh
Usul Addin
Islamic studies 
Islamic Economics&Banking 
 Faculty of Law:
Private law
Public law
 Faculty of Physical Education:
Physical Education
Sport Science
 Faculty of Archaeology and Anthropology: 
Archaeology
Anthropology
Epigraphy
 'Faculty of Tourism and Hotel Management:'
 Tourism 
Conservation and Management of Cultural Resources 
 Faculty of Mass Communication:
Public Relations and Advertising
Journalism
Radio & Television

Deanships & Centers 
Deanship of Student Affairs 
Deanship of Research and Graduate Studies 
The Language Center 
Computer & Information Center 
Faculty Development Center (FDC)
Queen Rania Center
Refugees & Displaced Persons & Migration Center
Center of Theoretical and Applied Physics Center
Speech and Hearing Center
The Jordanian Design Center (JDC)
Academic Entrepreneurship Center of Excellence 
UNESCO Chair for Desert Studies and Desertification Control
Marine Science Station Center (MSS)

Yarmouk University Press 
The university publishes several journals that are internationally peer-reviewed journals, they are published in cooperation with the Jordanian Ministry of Higher Education and Scientific Research, and other annual and semiannual periodicals:

Jordan Journal of Chemistry(LCCN 2006308967) 
Jordan Journal physics 
Jordan Journal of Mathematics and Statistics 
Jordan Journal of Modern Languages and Literature 
Jordan Journal of Arts 
Jordan Journal of Educational Sciences  

Periodicals published by the university that include dissertations and masters thesis works:
 Abhath Al-Yarmouk (AYBSE). 
 Abhath Al-Yarmouk (AYHSS).

Media 
Yarmouk University has an FM radio station that broadcasts 24/7 at the frequency 105.7 FM. The station Yarmouk FM broadcasts news, music,  political, social, and academic programs, and weather forecast.

Yarmouk University has a newspaper that published periodically. The newspaper Sahafat Al-Yarmouk publish in the following topics:
 news
 music
 political
 social
 academic programs

Notable alumni
 Emad Hajjaj, cartoonist.
 Shireen Abu Akleh, journalist
 Ahmad Hanandeh, Jordanian Minister of Digital Economy and Entrepreneurship
 Yousef Shamali, Jordanian Minister of Industry, Trade and Supply
 Nasser Shraideh, Jordanian Deputy Prime Minister for Economic Affairs and Minister of State for Public Sector Modernisation

References

External links

List of universities in Jordan

 
Educational institutions established in 1976
Irbid
1976 establishments in Jordan